Phnom Penh Cable Television, also known as PPCTV, is a cable TV subscription service established by Phnom Penh Municipal Cable Television (PPCTV). It is one of the major cable TV services in Cambodia with the largest number of viewers concentrated in Phnom Penh.

History 
PPCTV started distributing its services on cable with just only 36 channels in 1995, then expanding to 48 channels continued to 52 channels and finally 66 channels. It was the first cable provider in Cambodia, in partnership with TVB and Mediacorp.

In 2009, PPCTV started digital cable television service and broadband Internet.

In 2015, PPCTV and Mediacorp started the Phnom Penh Cable Television MediaCorp Awards.

References

External links
Official Website
List of Channels on Phnom Penh Cable Television (PPCTV)

Cable television companies
Television stations in Cambodia
Mass media in Phnom Penh